English singer and songwriter Rita Ora has received numerous awards and nominations.

Awards and nominations

Other accolades

Notes

References

External links 

Awards
Ora, Rita